Oqil Ghaybulloyevich Oqilov (Oqil Ghaybulloyevich Oqilov; ; born 2 February 1944) is a Tajikistani politician. He was the 7th Prime Minister of Tajikistan from 20 December 1999 to 23 November 2013. He is a member of the People's Democratic Party of Tajikistan.

See also
List of Prime Ministers of Tajikistan

References
AKILOV, Akil Gaibullayevich International Who's Who, accessed September 3, 2006.

1944 births
Living people
People's Democratic Party of Tajikistan politicians
Prime Ministers of Tajikistan
Tajikistani Muslims
People from Khujand